Smintheion or Smintheum was a town in ancient Troad, near Chryse, which contained a noted sanctuary of Apollo mentioned by Homer.

Its site is located near Külahlı (Gülpınar), Asiatic Turkey.

References

Populated places in ancient Troad
Former populated places in Turkey